Epaphius alpicola is a species of beetle in the family Carabidae. It was described by Sturn in 1825.

References

Beetles described in 1825